Joanna Anthony Ellis-Monaghan is an American mathematician and mathematics educator whose research interests include graph polynomials and topological graph theory. She is a professor of mathematics at the Korteweg-de Vries Institute for Mathematics of the University of Amsterdam.

Education and career
Ellis-Monaghan grew up in Alaska. She graduated from Bennington College in 1984 with a double major in mathematics and studio art, and earned a master's degree in mathematics from the University of Vermont in 1986. After beginning a doctoral program at Dartmouth College, she transferred to the University of North Carolina at Chapel Hill, where she completed her Ph.D. in 1995. Her dissertation, supervised by Jim Stasheff, was A unique, universal graph polynomial and its Hopf algebraic properties, with applications to the Martin polynomial.

She joined the Saint Michael's College faculty in 1992, chaired the department there, and has also held positions at the University of Vermont. In 2020 she became professor of Discrete Mathematics at the University of Amsterdam.

Contributions
With Iain Moffat, Ellis-Monaghan is the author of the book Graphs on Surfaces: Dualities, Polynomials, and Knots (Springer, 2013).

With Matt Boelkins, she is co-editor-in-chief of PRIMUS, a journal on the teaching of undergraduate mathematics.

References

External links
Home page

Year of birth missing (living people)
Living people
20th-century American mathematicians
21st-century American mathematicians
American women mathematicians
Graph theorists
Mathematics educators
Bennington College alumni
University of Vermont alumni
University of North Carolina at Chapel Hill alumni
Saint Michael's College faculty
University of Vermont faculty
Academic staff of the University of Amsterdam
20th-century women mathematicians
21st-century women mathematicians
20th-century American women
21st-century American women